USS Mahoning County (LST-914) was an  built for the United States Navy during World War II. Like many of her class, she was not named and is properly referred to by her hull designation. She was later named after Mahoning County, Ohio, she was the only US Naval vessel to bear the name.

Construction
LST-914 was laid down 16 February 1944, at Hingham, Massachusetts, by the Bethlehem-Hingham Shipyard; launched 18 April 1944; and commissioned 18 May 1944.

World War II

LST‑914 first engaged in combat duty with the invasion of southern France 15 August 1944. She carried US Army troops and equipment from Naples, Italy, and unloaded them on the beach of Cogolin. Shortly afterward the LST joined Training Group Command, Atlantic Fleet, and operated along the east and gulf coasts until early in 1945. On 10 February 1945, she departed Gulfport, Mississippi, for the Canal Zone en route to duty with the Pacific Fleet. Steaming via Pearl Harbor and Eniwetok, she arrived Saipan 25 April. For the next four months the ship carried men and equipment between Saipan and Okinawa, making occasional calls at Tinian and Guam. She departed Saipan 24 July, and sailed for the Philippines, operating there for the remainder of the War.

LST‑914 continued to operate in the Western Pacific after the Japanese surrender. On 26 June 1946, she decommissioned and was lent to the US Army. She was then given a Japanese crew and for the next four years transported general cargo in the Far East.

Korean War
With the outbreak of hostilities in Korea and the consequent urgent need for ships, LST‑914 recommissioned at Yokosuka, Japan, 26 August 1950. By 6 September, she was steaming for the combat zone. She embarked units of the 1st Marine Division at Pusan and transported them around the peninsula for the 15 September, Inchon invasion, one of the decisive amphibious assaults of history, which routed the North Korean Army. Following Inchon, for which her task element was awarded the Navy Unit Commendation, the LST participated in the Wonsan operations and in the evacuation of Hungnam, 10–24 December. On 13 January, she sailed for Kobe, Japan, underwent overhaul and returned to Korea in mid‑February. She continued to support operations off the Korean coast until 1 April 1951, then departed for San Diego, arriving 26 May.

Post-War duty
For the next 2 years LST‑914 operated off the West coast. In June 1953, she departed San Diego for her first Bar‑Change operation, the replenishment of bases in the Arctic. She returned to that duty during the summers of 1955‑1957, and plied the waters of the Arctic Ocean, operating primarily in the Beaufort Sea. En route to her 1955 Arctic deployment, LST‑914 was given the name Mahoning County in ceremonies at Seattle, Washington, 7 July. Among the sailors on board was Fireman Richard G. Adams of Struthers, Ohio, a city in Mahoning County. In addition to her Arctic cruises, the LST also participated in deployments in the western Pacific during the winters of 1954, 1956, and 1958.

In 1958, Mahoning County was awarded the Marjorie Sterrett Battleship Fund Award, which is presented annually by the US Navy's Chief of Naval Operations to the fleet's most battle-ready ship.

Mahoning County operated out of Long Beach for the first 9 months of 1959. On 5 September she decommissioned and was sold to Zidall Explorations, Inc. of Portland, Oregon on 22 June 1960 for scrapping.

Awards
LST‑914 received two battle stars for World War II service and six for Korean War service.

Notes

Citations

Bibliography 

Online resources

External links
 

 

LST-542-class tank landing ships
Mahoning County, Ohio
World War II amphibious warfare vessels of the United States
Cold War amphibious warfare vessels of the United States
Korean War amphibious warfare vessels of the United States
Ships built in Quincy, Massachusetts
1944 ships